Sir Alfred Edmund Bateman  (31 August 1844 – 7 August 1929) was a British Statistician, sometime president of the Royal Statistical Society.

References 

1844 births
1929 deaths
Knights Commander of the Order of St Michael and St George
British statisticians
Presidents of the Royal Statistical Society